This is a list of airlines currently operating in Bahrain.

Scheduled airlines

Charter airlines

Executive aviation

Cargo airlines

See also
 List of defunct airlines of Asia
 List of airlines

References

Bahrain
Airlines
Airlines
Bahrain